The 1964 San Francisco State Gators football team represented San Francisco State College—now known as San Francisco State University—as a member of the Far Western Conference (FWC) during the 1964 NCAA College Division football season. Led by fourth-year head coach Vic Rowen, San Francisco State compiled an overall record of 6–3–1 with a mark of 3–1–1 in conference play, placing third in the FWC. For the season the team outscored its opponents 203 to 172. The Gators played home games at Cox Stadium in San Francisco.

Schedule

Notes

References

San Francisco State
San Francisco State Gators football seasons
San Francisco State Gators football